David Avidan (Hebrew: דוד אבידן) (February 21, 1934 – May 11, 1995) was an Israeli "poet, painter, filmmaker, publicist, and playwright" (as he often put it). He wrote 20 published books of Hebrew poetry.

Biography and literary career
He was born in Tel Aviv, Israel, and studied Literature and Philosophy while briefly studying at Hebrew University. He wrote mostly in Hebrew, and was an avant-garde artist throughout his life. He translated many of his own poems into English, and received several awards both as a poet and as a translator.

He was not popular with most critics or the general public throughout his life, often criticized as being egocentric, chauvinistic, and technocratic. His first book, Lipless Faucets (1954), was attacked by nearly all poetry critics; the first favorable review was by Gabriel Moked, editor of the literary quarterly Akhshav, who later became one of Avidan's closest friends.

By the early 1990s he could scarcely make a living, and his mental condition had deteriorated. Avidan died in Tel Aviv, the city which had played a central role in his life, and was, in many ways, the center of his creation.

Avidan died on May 11, 1995 in his Tel Aviv apartment at the age of 61. Since his death, Avidan's reputation has been on the rise both in literary circles and in the popular imagination, positioning him as one of the core poets of the Israeli canon. A volume of Selected Poems by Avidan, "Futureman," translated by Tsipi Keller, has been published by Phoneme Media in 2017.

Awards
In 1993, Avidan was the co-recipient (jointly with Amalia Kahana-Carmon) of the Bialik Prize for Hebrew literature.

Movies
 Message from the Future, a 1981 Israeli film  Avidan wrote, directed and starred in, is a science fiction movie in English about future humans visiting present-day Israel. In the year 3005, a man is sent back to 1985 to convince the present leaders make certain that World War III happens, which he guarantees will make for a better future. Having already caused natural disasters and catastrophes by coming back from the future, he now tries to force his message on the world press and TV. Sheldon Teitelbaum has judged the film 'execrable'.

Books (poetry) – partial list
 Lipless Faucets, 1954
 Personal Problems, 1957
 Subtotal, 1960
 Pressure Poems, 1962
 Something for Someone, 1964
 A Book of Possibilities – Poems and More, 1985

See also
List of Bialik Prize recipients

References

Further reading
The Modern Hebrew Poem Itself (2003), 
 Futureman (2017)

External links
לקסיקון הספרות העברית החדשה – דוד אבידן  
NY Times obituary, retrieved October 5, 2008
http://mailchi.mp/1480e735fb8d/a-very-phoneme-fall

1934 births
1995 deaths
Jewish Israeli writers
Jewish Israeli artists
Jewish Israeli male actors
Israeli male poets
Israeli male painters
Israeli film directors
Israeli male film actors
Israeli male screenwriters
Burials at Yarkon Cemetery
20th-century Israeli poets
20th-century Israeli male actors
20th-century Israeli male artists
20th-century Israeli male writers
20th-century Israeli painters
Israeli science fiction writers
Hebrew-language poets
Hebrew-language playwrights
Film people from Tel Aviv
Hebrew University of Jerusalem alumni
Hebrew–English translators
Recipients of Prime Minister's Prize for Hebrew Literary Works
20th-century Israeli screenwriters
20th-century translators